Mallrats is a 1995 American buddy comedy film written and directed by Kevin Smith and starring Jason Lee, Jeremy London, Shannen Doherty, Claire Forlani, Ben Affleck, Jason Mewes, Joey Lauren Adams, Michael Rooker, and Smith as Silent Bob. It is the second film in the View Askewniverse and a prequel to 1994's Clerks.

As in the other Askewniverse films, the characters Jay and Silent Bob feature prominently, and characters and events from other films are discussed. Several cast members, including Jason Lee, Ben Affleck and Joey Lauren Adams, have gone on to work in several other Smith films. Comic-book icon Stan Lee appeared, as did Brian O'Halloran, the star of Smith's breakout feature Clerks.

Despite failing at the box office and receiving a lukewarm critical reception, Mallrats has since become a cult classic. Plans for a sequel film titled MallBrats were announced in March 2015. By the following year, the project was proposed to be a television miniseries, but by February 2017, Smith announced that he had not been able to sell the series to any network. In January 2020, Smith revealed that development on a sequel film has started again, this time under the title Twilight of the Mallrats.

Mallrats has had three versions released, with the main version being released amongst an extended version and a theatrical version. The theatrical release has a total of 100 differences between the extended and original version.

Plot
College student T.S. Quint is preparing for a trip to Universal Studios Florida in Orlando with Brandi Svenning, during which he plans to propose to her; however, Brandi tells him she cannot go due to having volunteered to fill in as a contestant on Truth or Date, her father's dating game show, because the original contestant had died from an embolism bursting in her brain while swimming 700 laps at the local Y.M.C.A following T.S.'s comment regarding her weight. Brandi and T.S. argue over his responsibility and the two break up. T.S. turns to his best friend Brodie Bruce, who has been dumped by his girlfriend Rene, and Brodie suggests the two might find comfort at the local mall.

Brodie and T.S. discover Truth or Date is being filmed at the same mall, through their friend Willam, who throughout the film tries to see a sailboat in a Magic Eye poster. The two ask local slackers Jay and Silent Bob to destroy the show's stage, a task for which they devise elaborate but ultimately unsuccessful plans. Brodie and T.S. run into Tricia Jones, a 15-year-old senior who is writing a book on the sex drive of men ages 14–30, for which she has sex with various men as research and films every encounter. She then reveals that the previous night she had sex with Shannon Hamilton, a 25-year-old clothing-store manager who hates Brodie because of his "lack of a shopping agenda."

Brodie then learns that Rene has begun a relationship with Shannon. Brodie confronts Rene to find out more about the relationship, and the two have sex in an elevator. Brodie is later abducted and attacked by Shannon, who intends to have sex with Rene in a "very uncomfortable place". As a result of this incident, Jay and Silent Bob assault the mall's Easter Bunny, under the incorrect assumption that he attacked Brodie.

Brandi's father Jared has Brodie and T.S. arrested on false charges of drug possession at the mall. Jay and Silent Bob are able to rescue Brodie and T.S., and they hide out at a local flea market, where they meet topless fortune teller Ivannah, who gives them both advice on their relationship problems. T.S. decides to win Brandi back and the two return to the mall.

Before the show begins, Brodie meets famed Marvel legend Stan Lee, who gives him advice on romance. After this, Brodie requests that his friend Tricia Jones retrieve footage of her having sex with Shannon. Meanwhile, T.S. also persuades Jay to get two of the game show contestants stoned, which allows him and Brodie to replace them on Truth or Date.

During the show, Brandi recognizes the voices of Brodie and T.S., and an on-air argument between them ensues. Brodie ultimately gets the two to stop arguing, explaining that T.S. has been pining for Brandi all day. T.S. proposes to Brandi, and she accepts. As the police arrive to arrest T.S. and Brodie after the show is over, Silent Bob plays a sex tape of Shannon and Tricia, resulting in his arrest for statutory rape. Brodie and Rene renew their relationship as a result.

The conclusion reveals that T.S. marries Brandi at Universal Studios while on a Jaws attraction, Tricia's book is a bestseller, Shannon is imprisoned (and subsequently raped), Willam eventually does see the sailboat, Brodie becomes the host of The Tonight Show (with Rene as his bandleader), and that Jay and Silent Bob get an orangutan named Susanne.

Cast

 Shannen Doherty as Rene Mosier
 Jeremy London as T.S. Quint
 Jason Lee as Brodie Bruce
 Claire Forlani as Brandi Svenning
 Ben Affleck as Shannon Hamilton
 Joey Lauren Adams as Gwen Turner
 Renee Humphrey as Tricia Jones
 Jason Mewes as Jay
 Kevin Smith as Silent Bob
 Ethan Suplee as Willam
 Stan Lee as himself
 Elizabeth Ashley (Extended Edition) as Governor Dalton
 Priscilla Barnes as Miss Ivannah
 Michael Rooker as Jared Svenning
 Sven-Ole Thorsen as LaFours
 Scott Mosier as Roddy
 Walt Flanagan as Walt "Fanboy" Grover
 Bryan Johnson as Steve-Dave Pulasti
 Brian O'Halloran as Gill Hicks, Suitor #3
 Art James as Bob Summers, host of Truth or Date
 Luke Wilson as a member of the audience watching Truth or Date (uncredited)

Production
After the success of the independent hit Clerks, writer/director Kevin Smith and his best friend/producer Scott Mosier began to make their second film. After a screening of Clerks, producer James Jacks approached them to do another film for Universal Studios. Smith soon finished the script for this new film, and casting began.

Jeremy London, an actor with a TV series and a few films to his credit, was cast as T.S.; Henry Thomas was the finalist of the role. Shannen Doherty was the most famous cast member after her appearances in several films and the hit TV show Beverly Hills, 90210. Jason Lee was cast with no prior acting experience; before the film, Lee was a professional skateboarder, and Adam Sandler and Steve Zahn were the finalists for the role of Brodie Bruce. Ben Affleck, who was a relative unknown at the time, was cast as Shannon Hamilton. Joey Lauren Adams was cast as Gwen Turner; she later dated Smith, and during that time, he wrote the main character in Chasing Amy for her. Ethan Suplee was cast as Willam Black. Scott Mosier was supposed to reprise the role, but Smith and the film's producers were so impressed with Suplee that they cast him, instead. The most troublesome role to cast was Jay, as Universal did not want Jason Mewes to have the role, despite the fact that he played it in  Clerks and the character of Jay is based on him.  Mewes had to audition for the part against actors such as Seth Green and Breckin Meyer.

Ties to New Jersey

 Rahway State Prison is mentioned at the end of the film
 Brodie wears a Henry Hudson Regional High School shirt at the beginning of the film. Kevin Smith and Jason Mewes attended that school in Highlands, New Jersey.
 Smith wanted to shoot the film in Seaview Square Mall in Ocean Township, New Jersey, but filmed it at Eden Prairie Center mall in Eden Prairie, Minnesota instead due to lower production costs.
 The exterior shot showing T.S. and Brodie's arrival at the flea market was of the now-demolished Route 1 Flea Market in New Brunswick, New Jersey.
 The Menlo Park Mall, located in Edison, New Jersey, is mentioned in the Easter Bunny beating scene. Brodie tells Jay and Silent Bob that the Easter Bunny assaulted him because "all I said was the Easter Bunny in the Menlo Park Mall was more convincing."

Reception
The film grossed $400,000 on its Friday gross on 800 screens. The film made $1.2 million its opening weekend. The film grossed $2,122,561 at the box office.

Mallrats was the subject of much critical derision when it was released, with many critics comparing it unfavorably to Smith's first film, Clerks. In his negative review of the film, critic Roger Ebert gave the film 1 1/2 stars out of 4 and said "Before Mallrats was released, I chaired a panel that Smith participated in and Kevin Smith cheerfully said he'd be happy to do whatever the studios wanted, if they'd pay for his films. At the time, I thought he was joking." Kevin Smith responded by apologizing for Mallrats at the 1996 Independent Spirit Awards, though he later stated that the apology was made in jest. Despite all that, the film developed a cult following after it was released on video.

On review aggregator Rotten Tomatoes, the film has an approval rating of 58% based on 48 reviews, with an average rating of 5.6/10. The website's critical consensus reads, "Mallrats colorfully expands the View Askewniverse, even if its snootchie has lost a few of the bootchies boasted by its beloved predecessor." On Metacritic, the film received a score of 41 based on 18 reviews, indicating "mixed or average reviews".

Home media
In 1996 MCA/Universal Home Video released the movie on VHS and Laserdisc (the latter in widescreen format).

A DVD was released in 1999 including 1.85:1 Anamorphic widescreen picture & 5.1 Dolby surround sound (both of which the movie was in for the Laserdisc release). Bonus features include:
 Audio commentary with director Kevin Smith, cast members Ben Affleck, Jason Lee, and Jason Mewes, and producers Scott Mosier & Vincent Pereira
 Deleted scenes
 Featurette-View Askew's Look Back At Mallrats
 Music Video-Build Me Up Buttercup by The Goops (Directed by Kevin Smith)
 Theatrical trailer
The film was released on Blu-ray in 2014 and it used digital noise reduction and edge enhancement (as part of Universal's 1990's Best of the Decade collection); the menus were replaced with Universal-mandated menus, the Focus Features logo replaced the Universal logo at the start of the film, and some copies also included a code for a digital streaming version to be redeemed at Universal's online UltraViolet service, and iTunes.

In 2005, a 10th anniversary double-sided DVD was released, containing the original version of the film, features from the previous DVD release, and an all new extended cut of the movie.

In 2020, Arrow Video released a 25th anniversary Blu-Ray that contains a third "television cut" of the film, with many scenes altered and re-dubbed to remove profanity.

Extended cut
The extended cut contains over 30 minutes of additional footage and subplots.
 An alternate opening scene, in which Mr. Svenning hosts a Ball for the Governor of New Jersey (played by Elizabeth Ashley). In this scene, T.S. (dressed as a colonial musketman), accidentally gets his musket tangled up in Brandi's hair, then accidentally shoots at the Governor on the roof of a school, which ends up costing Mr. Svenning his reputation as well as a big pay raise. This explains the reason why Svenning shows an intense dislike for T.S. and why Brandi is so intent on breaking up with him. This scene also makes no mention of Julie Dwyer's death, as the theatrical cut did. (That cut subplot was referenced in the final cut of the movie, where the TV execs mention to Svenning that they do not want a repeat of the Governor's Ball.)
 Multiple lines throughout the movie are restored, related to T.S.'s "attempted assassination" of the governor. Many of these have wildly different reasons for having seen T.S. on the news, such as Shannon's claim that he had tried to kidnap the President's daughter.
 An extended sequence at Brodie's house, where T.S. is hounded by the media as a result of his actions at the Governor's Ball, including several TV movie offers.
 Included scenes where T.S. also makes it known to Brandi that he proposed to marry her.
 A scene in which Brodie and T.S. arrive outside of Mr. Svenning's home, so T.S. can try and reconcile, and during the confusion, thanks to a news crew chasing T.S., then interviewing Brodie (who then implies that Mr. Svenning and Brandi take part in Satanic rituals), the news crew records footage of Svenning doing martial arts in a bath-towel. (Some of the footage of Mr. Svenning was re-edited in the theatrical release into the new intro.)
 A shot that shows the Quick Stop from Clerks.
 A new subplot of Brodie showing intentions of wanting to be on television, which explains his surprised look during his appearance on Truth or Date.
 The scene with Miss Ivannah has several restored lines.
 An extended arrest scene in which LaFours wants to put Brodie and T.S. into jail for an extended period of time, rather than "overnight" when the pair were initially arrested.
 An extended fight scene between Brodie and Shannon Hamilton, in which Hamilton tells Brodie to forget Rene.
 An extended rant from Mr. Svenning, a result of T.S. letting it slip that he intended to propose to Brandi.
 The scene where Mr. Svenning meets with Brodie before he has both Brodie and T.S. removed by LaFours has several restored lines and ends with more finger- and hand-licking of the melty pretzel chocolate by Mr. Svenning after the boys are removed.
 A scene after Truth or Date in which Mr. Svenning demands to have T.S. and Brodie arrested, but instead he is the one who is arrested. It turns out that since Svenning was the producer of the show, he faces multiple FCC fines for Brodie's antics.
 An extended "Where are they now?" ending sequence, in which Mr. Svenning is shown at his job at the network as a janitor (along with his production assistant, still wearing his headset), and Shannon Hamilton is shown screaming after his rape in prison.
 A scene that showed Tricia flirting and having sex with LaFours in order to distract him from catching Jay and Silent Bob. This explains the final segment in the 'where are they now' ending sequence, showing LaFours kissing Tricia during the book signing.

As explained by Kevin Smith in the introduction, most of the scenes were reworked because of the test audience's negative reaction. Some of the dialogue had been re-dubbed in the theatrical release, but is restored in this version. (For example, the man who runs up to and is subsequently punched by T.S. outside the mall near the end originally asked if he had seen T.S. on CNN, whereas in the theatrical cut, he asks T.S. if he was the one who broke up with Brandi Svenning.) Other extended scenes have notable jump cuts.

The original DVD's deleted scenes reel also featured the first draft opening sequence (in script form); here, T.S. is competing on a collegiate game show produced by Mr. Svenning; he accidentally mispronounces an answer ("Bay of Bisquake" instead of Bay of Biscay); his team loses, and in the confusion, T.S. accidentally damages a camera, and he must now pay Mr. Svenning for the damages. Brandi then breaks up with him, and a man on a bus mistakenly thinks that T.S. will kill him after seeing him in a news report. Several alternate openings, with different voiceover spiels from Brodie (including one which has him recounting the events up to him nearly getting assaulted by Hamilton on the Truth or Date stage) were also seen in that reel.

Soundtrack

The soundtrack album was released in October 1995. It features mainly alternative rock from the 90s along with dialogue from the film. The ordering of the songs on the soundtrack album is not the order they appear as in the film. For example, Squirtgun's "Social" opens the film, while Weezer's "Susanne" ends the film, with Wax's "Mallrats" playing over the end credits. The song "Boogie Shoes" by KC and the Sunshine Band makes an appearance, when Brodie and T.S. drive to the flea market. However, it was excluded from the soundtrack album. A music video for The Goops' version of "Build Me Up Buttercup" was directed by Smith and featured both Smith and Mewes.

Sequel
On March 13, 2015, Kevin Smith confirmed that Mallrats 2 was being written and was slated to begin shooting in summer 2016. In April 2015, Smith announced that Mallrats 2 would be his next film, instead of Clerks III as originally intended, and would begin filming in 2015. From April 2015 to July 2016, Smith made a series of announcements regarding the proposed sequel, some regarding casting and some announcing delays in production. During this time, the planned film became a planned 10-episode television miniseries.

In February 2017, Smith announced that pitches to six different networks resulted in no one willing to produce the TV series, but expressed his hope that interest in the series would spike after the release of the film Jay and Silent Bob Reboot.

In January 2020, Smith announced that development on a Mallrats sequel film has started up again, under a new title Twilight of the Mallrats. On April 24, Smith stated that he has officially completed the first draft of the script and that the original cast will return. On May 12, 2020, Smith revealed that Aparna Brielle, who played Jihad in Jay and Silent Bob Reboot, has been set to lead the film as Banner, the daughter of Brodie, and that Shannen Doherty would return to reprise her role of Rene Mosier.

References

External links

 
 
 
 Mallrats at View Askew Productions

1995 films
1995 comedy films
1990s buddy comedy films
American buddy comedy films
Depictions of Stan Lee on film
Films directed by Kevin Smith
Films produced by James Jacks
Films set in 1993
Films set in New Jersey
Films set in shopping malls
Films shot in Minnesota
Films shot in New Jersey
Films with screenplays by Kevin Smith
View Askew Productions films
View Askewniverse films
Universal Pictures films
Films scored by Ira Newborn
Gramercy Pictures films
Prequel films
Films produced by Scott Mosier
Easter Bunny in film
1990s English-language films
1990s American films
American prequel films